Labyrinthus chiriquensis is a species of air-breathing land snail, a terrestrial pulmonate gastropod mollusk in the family Labyrinthidae.

Description 

Distribution 
This species occurs in Panama.

References

External links
 Flickr.com

Labyrinthidae
Gastropods described in 1910